Robards may refer to:

Jason Robards (1922–2000), American actor
Jason Robards, Sr. (1892–1963), American stage and screen actor; father of Jason Robards
Karen Robards (born 1955), American author of romance novels
Sam Robards (born 1961), American actor; son of Jason Robards and Lauren Bacall
William S. Robards (fl. 1806–1830), American politician from North Carolina

Places
Robards, Kentucky

See also
Robarts (disambiguation)